In the mathematical study of metric spaces, one can consider the arclength of paths in the space.  If two points are at a given distance from each other, it is natural to expect that one should be able to get from the first point to the second along a path whose arclength is equal to (or very close to) that distance.  The distance between two points of a metric space relative to the intrinsic metric is defined as the infimum of the lengths of all paths from the first point to the second.  A metric space is a length metric space if the intrinsic metric agrees with the original metric of the space.

If the space has the stronger property that there always exists a path that achieves the infimum of length (a geodesic) then it is called a geodesic metric space or geodesic space. For instance, the Euclidean plane is a geodesic space, with line segments as its geodesics. The Euclidean plane with the origin removed is not geodesic, but is still a length metric space.

Definitions

The length of such a path is defined as explained for rectifiable curves. If

.

Examples
 Euclidean space  with the ordinary Euclidean metric is a path metric space.  is as well.
The induced intrinsic metric on  measures distances as angles in radians, and the resulting length metric space is called the Riemannian circle. In two dimensions, the chordal metric on the sphere is not intrinsic, and the induced intrinsic metric is given by the great-circle distance.
 Every connected Riemannian manifold can be turned into a path metric space by defining the distance of two points as the infimum of the lengths of continuously differentiable curves connecting the two points. (The Riemannian structure allows one to define the length of such curves.)  Analogously, other manifolds in which a length is defined included Finsler manifolds and sub-Riemannian manifolds.
 Any complete and convex metric space is a length metric space , a result of Karl Menger.  However, the converse does not hold, i.e. there exist length metric spaces that are not convex.

Properties 
The space  is always a path metric space (with the caveat, as mentioned above, that  can be infinite).
The metric of a length space has approximate midpoints. Conversely, every complete metric space with approximate midpoints is a length space.

References

  Herbert Busemann, Selected Works, (Athanase Papadopoulos, ed.) Volume I, 908 p., Springer International Publishing, 2018.

  Herbert Busemann, Selected Works, (Athanase Papadopoulos, ed.) Volume II, 842 p., Springer International Publishing, 2018.

 

Metric geometry